César Gabriel Atamañuk (born 9 April 1996) is an Argentine professional footballer who plays as a goalkeeper for Colegiales.

Career
Atamañuk played in the youth set-up of Vélez Sarsfield, having signed from Tigre in 2014. In 2017, after a short stint with Luján, Atamañuk joined Torneo Federal B's El Linqueño. Eleven appearances followed, which preceded his departure on 4 November 2017. On 9 July 2018, Atamañuk was signed by Colegiales of Primera B Metropolitana. He made his debut in a 3–1 defeat away to San Telmo on 25 February 2019, as he replaced Daniel Monllor after fifty-eight minutes. His first start arrived against All Boys in the succeeding March, a month which saw him appear three more times for the club.

Career statistics
.

References

External links

1996 births
Living people
Argentine people of Ukrainian descent
People from Moreno Partido
Argentine footballers
Association football goalkeepers
Primera B Metropolitana players
Club Luján footballers
Club Atlético El Linqueño players
Club Atlético Colegiales (Argentina) players
Sportspeople from Buenos Aires Province